Bank Muscat is a financial services provider in the Sultanate of Oman providing corporate banking, retail banking, investment banking, treasury, private banking and asset management. The bank, with assets worth  US$ 31.9 billion in 2018, has the largest network in Oman exceeding 150 branches.

Operations 
The international operations consist of a branch each in Riyadh, Saudi Arabia and & Kuwait and & representative offices in Dubai, UAE and & Bahrain representative offices in Manama, Bahrain and Muharraq, Bahrain and & Al Hidd, Bahrain and & Hamad Town, Bahrain Riffa, Bahrain and & Isa Town, Bahrain and & Sitra, Bahrain and & Arad, Bahrain and & Bahrian International Airport, Muharraq, Bahrain and & Muharraq Island, Bahrain and & Diyar Al Muharraq, Bahrain and & Muharraq Governorate, Bahrain and & Capital Governorate, Bahrain and & Southern Governorate, Bahrain and & Northern Governorate, Bahrain and & Singapore. The Bank has whole ownership of Muscat Capital, a brokerage and investment banking entity in Saudi Arabia, and a 11.8% stake in Silkbank in Pakistan.

Recognition 
Bank Muscat was voted the ‘Best Bank in Oman’ for seven years by The Banker, FT London; nine years in a row by Global Finance and Euromoney. Bank Muscat is the recipient of the Hewitt recognition as the Middle East’s Best Employer 2009. The Bank was declared an Investor in People (IiP) organisation in January 2007, becoming the first banking organisation in the MENA region to be awarded the global recognition. In 2004, Bank Muscat became the first bank in the Middle East to be completely ISO 9000:2000 certified.

International issues 
In 2013, the bank was hit by a $39 million fraud scheme using prepaid travel cards accessed from outside of Oman. This led to an impairment charge impacting 10.5% of Bank Muscat's earnings for the period.

In 2016, the United States Department of the Treasury secretly issued a license to Bank Muscat to convert $5.7 billion in Iranian overseas reserves from Omani rials into euros via United States dollars, something not normally permitted due to United States sanctions against Iran.

References

External links

1982 establishments in Oman
Banks established in 1982
Banks of Oman
Companies based in Muscat, Oman